The 2006 Sydney to Hobart Yacht Race, sponsored by Rolex, was the 62nd annual running of the "blue water classic" Sydney to Hobart Yacht Race. As in past editions of the race, it was hosted by the Cruising Yacht Club of Australia based in Sydney, New South Wales. As with previous Sydney to Hobart Yacht Races, the 2006 edition began on Sydney Harbour, at 1pm on Boxing Day (26 December 2006), before heading south for 630 nautical miles (1,170 km) through the Tasman Sea, past Bass Strait, into Storm Bay and up the River Derwent, to cross the finish line in Hobart, Tasmania.

The 2006 fleet comprised 78 starters of which 69 completed the race and nine yachts retired.

Results

Line Honours results (top 10)

Handicap Results (top 10)

References

Sydney to Hobart Yacht Race
S
2006 in Australian sport
December 2006 sports events in Australia
January 2007 sports events in Australia